23 Librae c (23 Lib c) is an extrasolar planet like Jupiter discovered in 2009 orbiting the star 23 Librae. It has one of the longest known orbits of a planet detected via radial velocity. The actual orbital period of this planet range from 4600 to 5400 days (from 12.5 to 15 years). The reason the error range for orbital period is so large is because this planet did not complete the orbit during the time of continuous observations. Using the range of orbital periods, this planet's average distance would sit between 5.3 and 6.3 AU.

References

Libra (constellation)
Exoplanets discovered in 2009
Exoplanets detected by radial velocity
Giant planets